Martti Johannes Liuttula (12 January 1894 – 17 November 1979) was a Finnish sport shooter who competed in the 1924 Summer Olympics.

In the 1924 Summer Olympics he participated in the following events:

 Team 100 metre running deer, double shots - fourth place
 100 metre running deer, single shots - fifth place
 Team 100 metre running deer, single shots - fifth place
 100 metre running deer, double shots - 15th place

References

External links 
 

1894 births
1979 deaths
Finnish male sport shooters
Running target shooters
Olympic shooters of Finland
Shooters at the 1924 Summer Olympics